Mark Robert Brennan (born 4 October 1965) is an English former professional footballer who played in the Football League for Ipswich Town, Middlesbrough and Manchester City, in the Premier League for Oldham Athletic, in the Chinese Jia-A League for Guangdong Hongyuan, and in the Australian National Soccer League for Sydney Olympic.

He went on to play state league football in Australia and non-League football in England. At international level, Brennan was capped five times for the England under-21 team.

Honours
 Full Members Cup: runner up 1989–90 with Middlesbrough

References

External links
 
 OzFootball

1965 births
Living people
People from Rawtenstall
Association football midfielders
English footballers
England under-21 international footballers
Ipswich Town F.C. players
Middlesbrough F.C. players
Manchester City F.C. players
Oldham Athletic A.F.C. players
Guangdong Winnerway F.C. players
Sydney Olympic FC players
St George FC players
Dagenham & Redbridge F.C. players
Billericay Town F.C. players
Canvey Island F.C. players
English Football League players
Premier League players
National Soccer League (Australia) players
National League (English football) players
British expatriates in China
Expatriate footballers in China
British expatriates in Australia
Expatriate soccer players in Australia